Thirumathi Thamizh is a 2013 Indian Tamil-language romantic comedy film directed by Rajakumaran. The film stars himself alongside Devayani and Keerthi Chawla with Ramesh Khanna in a supporting role. The film released on 13 April 2013.

Cast 

 Rajakumaran as Thamizhselvan 
 Devayani as Jothi
 Keerthi Chawla  as Charumathi 
 Ramesh Khanna as Manoharan, Thamizh's friend
 Babloo Prithiveeraj as the groom
 Radharavi
 Rohini
 Charuhasan
 Madhan Bob
 Vaiyapuri
 Sri Durga
 Scissor Manohar
 Crane Manohar 
 Delhi Ganesh
 Chitti Babu
 Thalaivasal Vijay as Vijay, Police Officer
 Shyam
 Sathyapriya
 Fathima Babu
 Shruthika
Pasi Sathya 
 Nellai Siva
 Malaysia Vasudevan
 LIC Narasimhan
 Livingston as a lawyer
 Bonda Mani as a priest
 Ganja Karuppu
 Pandu

Production 
The film began production in 2008 under director Rajakumaran in his debut film as an actor. Keerthi Chawla signed in February 2008 and shot for this film simultaneously with Mahesh, Saranya Matrum Palar (2008) which featured her in a guest appearance. This film is Devayani's 75th film. This film is the last film of veteran actor Malaysia Vasudevan.

Soundtrack 
The music was composed by S. A. Rajkumar. The film features nine songs.
"Thamizh Thamizh" - S. P. Balasubrahmanyam
"Thamizh Thamizh" (Remix 1) - S. P. Balasubramaniam, K. S. Chithra, S. A. Rajkumar
"Thamizh Thamizh" (Remix 2) - Chitra, S. A. Rajkumar
"Thirukkural" - SPB, S. A. Rajkumar
"Nayagan" -  Kalyani, Vijay Yesudas, S. A. Rajkumar
 "Nayagan" (Remix 1) -  Kalyani
 "Nayagan" (Remix 2) -  S. A. Rajkumar
 "Va Va Vennilave" - Swetha Mohan, Mukesh Mohamed
 "Va Va Vennilave" (Remix) - Swetha Mohan

Release 
The Times of India gave the film one out of five stars and wrote that "The movie could have made for a much better watch had the director focused on the social issues it started out to discuss". A critic from Kungumam panned the screenplay.

References 

2013 films
Indian romantic drama films
2010s Tamil-language films
2013 romantic drama films